Large black flying squirrel (genus Aeromys) form a taxon of squirrels under the tribe Pteromyini. They are only found in South-east Asia.

Species
There are two species of large black flying squirrel:
Black flying squirrel, Aeromys tephromelas
Thomas's flying squirrel, Aeromys thomasi

References
Thorington, R. W. Jr. and R. S. Hoffman. 2005. Family Sciuridae. pp. 754–818 in Mammal Species of the World a Taxonomic and Geographic Reference. D. E. Wilson and D. M. Reeder eds. Johns Hopkins University Press, Baltimore.

Aeromys